Virgin Soil Upturned may refer to:
 Virgin Soil Upturned (1939 film), a Soviet drama film
 Virgin Soil Upturned (1959 film), a Soviet drama film
 Virgin Soil Upturned (novel), a novel by Mikhail Sholokhov